Hope Town is a municipality in the Gaspésie–Îles-de-la-Madeleine region of the province of Quebec in Canada. Despite its name, the place does not have a "town" (ville) status.

History
In 1768, the first pioneer arrived, a certain Duncan McRae, a soldier of the Seaforth Highlanders and native of Dundee in Scotland. His friend and fellow soldier John Ross, who also served in General Wolfe's army, is thought to be the one that attributed the name "Hope" to the place. In 1786, a wave of Loyalists followed and the village was really established.

In 1936, the place separated from Hope Township and was incorporated as the Municipality of Hope East. In 1953, it was renamed to Hope Town.

Demographics

Population

Language
Mother tongue:
 English as first language: 47%
 French as first language: 53%
 English and French as first language: 0%
 Other as first language: 0%

See also
List of municipalities in Quebec

References

Incorporated places in Gaspésie–Îles-de-la-Madeleine
Municipalities in Quebec